Ronald Baker may refer to:

Ronald L. Baker (born 1937), American folklorist
Ronald James Baker (born 1924), president of the University of Prince Edward Island
Ronald John Baker (1912–1990), Canadian engineer
Ron Baker (American football) (born 1954), offensive lineman for the Baltimore Colts and the Philadelphia Eagles
Ronnie Baker (musician) (1947–1990), American record producer, bassist, arranger and songwriter
Ronnie Baker (athlete) (born 1993), American track and field athlete